KGTO (1050 AM) is a radio station licensed to serve Tulsa, Oklahoma. The station is owned by Perry Publishing and Broadcasting and licensed to KJMM, Inc. It airs an Urban Adult Contemporary music format.  Its studios are located in the Copper Oaks complex in South Tulsa.

The station has been assigned these call letters by the Federal Communications Commission since February 1, 1982, having chosen them to signify "Greater Tulsa's Oldies", a format change. Previous formats included country music and religious broadcasting.

KGTO's transmitter site at 5400 West Edison was depicted in 1988 in UHF as the location of fictional television station "U-62". While a transmitter tower remains at this location, the original building at the site was removed in 2001.

Translators

References

External links
KGTO official website

GTO
Urban adult contemporary radio stations in the United States